The 2019–20 Campeonato de Portugal was the seventh season of Portuguese football's renovated third-tier league, since the merging of the Segunda Divisão and Terceira Divisão in 2013, and the fifth season under the current Campeonato de Portugal title. A total of 72 teams competed in this league, which began in August 2019 and was scheduled to finish in June 2020.

On 8 April 2020, the Portuguese Football Federation (FPF) cancelled all non-professional competitions due to the COVID-19 pandemic in Portugal. The following month, on 2 May, the FPF ruled that Vizela and Arouca, the two teams with the most points in all first-stage series at the time of cancellation, were promoted to the 2020–21 LigaPro. No league winner title was awarded and no teams were relegated to the District championships.

Format
The competition format consisted of two stages. In the first stage, the 72 clubs were divided in four series of 18 teams, according to geographic criteria. In each series, teams played against each other in a home-and-away double round-robin system. The two best-placed teams in each series would advance to the second stage, while the five bottom teams would be relegated to the District championships.
In the second stage, the eight teams disputed a series of double-legged home-and-away play-off matches, and the two play-off finalist teams would be promoted to the 2020–21 LigaPro.

Teams

Relegated from the 2018–19 LigaPro:
  Arouca
  Braga B
 Vitória de Guimarães B

From the 2018–19 Campeonato de Portugal:

From Play-offs:
 Praiense
 União de Leiria
 Fafe
 Lusitânia Lourosa
 Sp. Espinho
 Vizela

From Serie A:
 S. Martinho
 Trofense
 Felgueiras
 Mirandela
 Chaves B
 Merelinense
 Montalegre
 Pedras Salgadas
 Maria da Fonte
 AD Oliveirense

From Serie C:
 Anadia
 Benfica Castelo Branco
 Sintrense
 Oliveira do Hospital
 Alverca
 Caldas
 Oleiros
 Torreense
 Fátima
 Loures
 Sertanense
From Serie B:
 Gondomar
 Águeda
 Lusitano Vildemoinhos
 Sanjoanense
 Amarante
 Coimbrões
 Marítimo B
 Paredes
 União da Madeira
 Leça
 Pedras Rubras

From Serie D:
 Real
 Oriental
 Olhanense
 Amora
 1.º Dezembro
 Armacenenses
 Louletano
 Olímpico Montijo
 Sp. Ideal
 Pinhalnovense
 Sacavenense

Promoted from the 2018–19 District Championships: 

 Algarve FA: Esperança de Lagos
 Aveiro FA: Beira-Mar
 Azores Champ.: Fontinhas
 Beja FA: Aljustrelense
 Braga FA: Berço SC
 Bragança FA: Bragança 
 Castelo Branco FA: Vitória de Sernache
 Coimbra FA: Condeixa
 Évora FA: Lusitano de Évora
 Guarda FA: Ginásio Figueirense
 Leiria FA: Marinhense
 Lisboa FA: Sintra Football
 Madeira FA: Câmara de Lobos
 Portalegre FA: Mosteirense 
 Porto FA: Canelas 2010 and Valadares Gaia 
 Santarém FA: União de Santarém
 Setúbal FA: Fabril Barreiro
 Viana do Castelo FA: Cerveira
 Vila Real FA: Vila Real
 Viseu FA: Castro Daire

Notes

Group stage

Serie A

Serie B

Serie C

Serie D

References

Campeonato Nacional de Seniores seasons
3
Por